The statue of Josef Jungmann is an outdoor sculpture installed in Prague, Czech Republic.

External links

 

Monuments and memorials in Prague
New Town, Prague
Outdoor sculptures in Prague
Sculptures of men in Prague
Statues in Prague